Christopher O'Brien may refer to:

 Christopher O'Brien (admiral), Irish naval officer of the eighteenth century
 Christopher D. O'Brien (1848–?), former mayor of St. Paul, Minnesota
 Christopher O'Brien (rugby league) (born 1950), Welsh rugby union and rugby league footballer of the 1970s and 1980s

See also
Chris O'Brien (disambiguation)